The Morningside Medal of Mathematics is awarded to exceptional mathematicians of Chinese descent under the age of forty-five for their seminal achievements in mathematics and applied mathematics. The winners of the Morningside Medal of Mathematics are traditionally announced at the opening ceremony of the triennial International Congress of Chinese Mathematicians. Each Morningside Medalist receives a certificate, a medal, and cash award of US$25,000 for a gold medal, or US$10,000 for a silver medal.

Gold Medalists

Silver Medalists

See also

 List of mathematics awards

References 

Mathematics awards
Awards with age limits